The Montvale Hotel is a boutique hotel in Spokane, Washington.  Originally built in 1889 as an SRO (Single Room Occupancy Hotel), the Montvale Hotel also served Spokane as an apartment building, a brothel, and as a youth hostel during Expo '74 and then was abandoned for 30 years. It was restored and re-opened in January 2005 as a 36-room boutique hotel, becoming one of Spokane's premier hotels with The Davenport Hotel and the Hotel Lusso.

With the demolition of the Pennington Wing at the Davenport Hotel, the Montvale gained the distinction as Spokane's oldest hotel.  Kilmer and Son's Hardware was located on buildings' main floor for over 60 years.  Kilmer once employed Henry J. Kaiser.

Currently located in the same building as the Montvale Hotel is Scratch Restaurant  and is located on the street level of the building.

See also
 List of Historic Hotels of America

References

National Register of Historic Places in Spokane, Washington
Buildings and structures in Spokane, Washington
Hotel buildings on the National Register of Historic Places in Washington (state)